Chitrella is a genus of pseudoscorpions in the family of Syarinidae.

Distribution 

The species in this genus are endemic to the United States.

List of species 

According to Pseudoscorpions of the World 1.2:
 Chitrella archeri Malcolm & Chamberlin, 1960
 Chitrella cala (Chamberlin, 1930)
 Chitrella cavicola (Packard, 1884)
 Chitrella elliotti Muchmore, 1992
 Chitrella major Muchmore, 1992
 Chitrella muesebecki Malcolm & Chamberlin, 1960
 Chitrella regina Malcolm & Chamberlin, 1960
 Chitrella superba Muchmore, 1973
 Chitrella transversa (Banks, 1909)
 Chitrella welbourni Muchmore, 1992

Original publication 
  Beier, 1932 : Pseudoscorpionidea I. Subord. Chthoniinea et Neobisiinea. Tierreich, .
  Chamberlin, 1930 : A synoptic classification of the false scorpions or chela-spinners, with a report on a cosmopolitan collection of the same. Part II. The Diplosphyronida (Arachnida-Chelonethida). Annals and Magazine of Natural History, ser. 10, n. 5, .

References

External links 
 
 
 
 Reference Classification by Harvey in Hallan

Fauna of the United States
Neobisioidea